The Lubbock Challenger is a tennis tournament held in Lubbock, Texas, USA, since 2005. The event is part of the ATP challenger series and is played on outdoor hard courts.

Past finals

Singles

Doubles

External links 
 
ITF search

Hard court tennis tournaments in the United States
ATP Challenger Tour